Britannia is a preserved First World War British Mark IV Female heavy tank. It toured Canada and the United States to raise money. Later renamed Liberty it is now displayed at the United States Army Ordnance Museum, Aberdeen, Maryland.

History
The Tank was reported as taking part in battles in Flanders.

In 1917 it toured Canada as part of the Victory Loan Parade to sell war bonds; it was seen on the streets of Montreal on November 19, 1917, and Toronto on November 21, 1917.

On February 23, 1918, it was reported that it got into an accident during a training exercise at Fort Dix, New Jersey,  the tank then toured, for the Liberty Loan parade under the Britannia name. It was in the second Liberty Loan parade in New York City during February of 1918. Also, appearing in Boston in April 1918.

Preservation
It was renamed Liberty and is now displayed at the United States Army Ordnance Museum, Aberdeen, Maryland, joining the Ordnance Museum collection in 1919. After decades of exposure to the elements, it is in poor condition.

See also

Mephisto - a German A7V tank

Notes

References

 

  

World War I tanks of United Kingdom 
Individual tanks